The Jerantut railway station, also known as 'Jungle Station', is a Malaysian train station stationed at and named after the town of Jerantut, Pahang.

The Jerantut KTM railway station is one of the major stations of KTM's East Coast Line. KTM intercity and express trains stop at this station.

Train services
 Ekspres Rakyat Timuran 26/27 Tumpat–JB Sentral
 Ekspres Makmur Kuala 34/35 Lipis–Gemas

Around the station
 National Park
Kota Gelanggi Caves
Lata Meraung Waterfall
Orang Asli Settlement

References

External links
 Jerantut KTM Railway Station

Jerantut District
KTM East Coast Line stations
Railway stations in Pahang